Perks is a surname.

List of people with the surname
 Ellis Perks (born 1997), British speedway rider
 Gord Perks (born 1963), Canadian environmentalist, political activist, writer and Toronto city councillor
 Marcelle Perks, British author and journalist
 Micah Perks (born 1963), American fiction writer and memoirist
 Reg Perks (1911–1977), English cricketer
 Robert Perks (1849–1934), British politician
 Sarah Perks, English curator and producer of contemporary visual art and independent films
 Thomas Perks (1883–1953), English cricketer
 William George Perks, better known as Bill Wyman, bassist of the Rolling Stones

See also
 Parks (surname)
 Perkins
 Perks (disambiguation)

English-language surnames
Surnames of English origin
Surnames of British Isles origin